Jock James Hamilton Dalrymple (born 14 October 1957) is a Scottish former first-class cricketer.

The son of Sir Hew Hamilton-Dalrymple and Lady Anne-Louise Mary Keppel, he was born at St John's Wood in October 1957. He was educated at Ampleforth College, before going up to Queen's College, Oxford. While studying at Oxford, he made three appearances in first-class cricket for Oxford University in 1978, playing against Gloucestershire, Yorkshire and Sussex. He scored 27 runs in his three matches, while with his right-arm fast-medium bowling, he took 7 wickets with best figures of 3 for 34. After graduating from Oxford, he was ordained as a Catholic priest. His brother is the historian William Dalrymple and he is a cousin of Virginia Woolf.

References

External links

1957 births
Living people
People from St John's Wood
People educated at Ampleforth College
Alumni of The Queen's College, Oxford
English cricketers
Oxford University cricketers
20th-century English Roman Catholic priests
21st-century English Roman Catholic priests
Younger sons of baronets